Christopher O'Donnell may refer to:
 Chris O'Donnell (born 1970), American actor
 Christopher O'Donnell (athlete) (born 1998), Irish track and field athlete